Kipp is an unincorporated community on the border between Eureka and Solomon townships in Saline County, Kansas, United States.  As of the 2020 census, the population of the community and nearby areas was 60.  It is located southeast of Salina along Schilling Road between Whitmore Road and Kipp Road, next to an abandoned railroad.

History
A post office was opened in Kipp in 1890, and remained in operation until it was discontinued in 1957.

Geography
Its elevation is 1207 feet (368 m), and it is located at  (38.7838911, -97.4544748).  The West Branch of Gypsum Creek flows through the community.

Demographics

For statistical purposes, the United States Census Bureau has defined Kipp as a census-designated place (CDP). Also, this community is a part of the Salina micropolitan area.

Education
The community is served by Southeast of Saline USD 306 public school district.  The district high school, Southeast of Saline, is located 4 miles west of  Gypsum.

Kipp schools were closed through school unification. The Kipp High School mascot was Kipp Orioles. The Kipp Orioles won the Kansas State High School class B baseball championship in 1949.

References

Further reading

External links
 Saline County maps: Current, Historic, KDOT

Census-designated places in Saline County, Kansas
Census-designated places in Kansas
1890 establishments in Kansas
Populated places established in 1890